Duke of Berry or Duchess of Berry was a title in the Peerage of France. The Duchy of Berry, centred on Bourges, was originally created as an appanage for junior members of the French royal family and was frequently granted to female royals. The style Duke of Berry was later granted by several Bourbon monarchs to their grandsons. The last official Duke of Berry was Charles Ferdinand of Artois, son of Charles X. The title Duke of Berry is currently used as a courtesy title by Prince Alphonse de Bourbon, son of the Legitimist Pretender to the French Throne Louis Alphonse de Bourbon.

House of Valois (1360-1505)
On October 1360, King John II created the peerage-duchy of Berry as an appanage for his third-born son, John of Poitiers, perhaps on the occasion of his marriage with Joan of Armagnac. Upon his death in 1416, John of Poitiers was succeeded as Duke of Berry by his grandnephew John, Dauphin of France (having been predeceased in 1397 by his only son who survived into adulthood, John, Count of Montpensier).. After Dauphin John's death in 1417, the appanage passed to his younger brother the Dauphin Charles. The Dauphin subsequently moved his court to Berry's capital of Bourges to escape the advancing English during the Hundred Years’ War. When the Dauphin ascended to the throne as Charles VII, Berry returned to the royal domain.

In 1461, Louis XI granted Berry to his younger brother, Charles. Charles maintained a rivalry with his brother and joined the League of the Public Weal, an anti-royal alliance of French magantes lead by the Count of Charolais. After a short war against Louis XI which was concluded with the Treaty of Conflans in 1465, Charles gained the Duchy of Normandy (which he then exchanged for the Duchy of Guyenne in 1469). Charles died without legitimate issue in 1472 due to syphilis, although some believed he was a victim of poisoning. With no male heir, the title reverted to the Crown once again.

In 1498, Louis XII granted Berry to his former wife Joan of France, daughter of Louis XI, as compensation for their marriage's annulment. She was the first suo jure Duchess, and after her death without issue Berry returned to the Crown.

House of Valois-Angoulême (1527-1601)
In 1527, King Francis I granted his sister Marguerite the duchy of Berry, probably on the occasion of her marriage to Henry II of Navarre. After her death without male issue in 1549, Berry reverted to the Crown.

In 1550, King Henry II granted Berry to his sister Margaret of Valois for life. After the death of Margaret of Valois in 1574, her nephew King Henry III granted Berry and the County of La Marche to his sister-in-law and Queen dowager of France Elisabeth of Austria. However in 1577, as a consequence of the Peace of Monsieur, Elisabeth of Austria was forced by King Henry III to exchange Berry and La Marche (which then became part of the expanded appanage of his brother Francis, Duke of Anjou) for the duchies of Auvergne and Bourbon. After Francis, Duke of Anjou's death in 1584, Berry and his other appanages again returned to the Crown.

In 1589, King Henry IV granted Berry to King Henry III's widow Louise of Lorraine for her lifetime.

House of Bourbon (1686-1820)
In 1686, King Louis XIV granted the style Duke of Berry to his third grandson Charles who continued to use it as his primary title until his death in 1714, despite never gaining the appanage of Berry. In 1754, King Louis XV stylized his newborn grandson Louis-Auguste as Duke of Berry until his ascension as Dauphin of France in 1765, after his father's death.

In 1778, King Louis XVI re-established the Duchy of Berry as an appanage for his newborn nephew, Charles Ferdinand of Artois, who was killed in 1820 by Louis Pierre Louvel, a Bonapartist.

See also
House of France
Très Riches Heures du Duc de Berry

References

Berry
 
 
Berry
Berry

ru:Герцогство Беррийское#Герцоги Беррийские